Neelam Gorhe is an Indian politician and deputy leader of Shiv Sena from Maharashtra. She is 13th and currently Deputy Chairman of Maharashtra Legislative Council and a member of Maharashtra Legislative Council. She had been elected to Legislative Council for four consecutive terms in 2002, 2008, 2014 and 2020. She is now currently acting Chairman of Maharashtra Legislative Council on 7 July 2022.

Positions held
 2002: Elected to Maharashtra Legislative Council (1st term)
 2008: Re-Elected to Maharashtra Legislative Council (2nd term)
 2010: Spokesperson of Shiv Sena 
 2011 Onwards: Deputy Leader, Shiv Sena  
 2014: Re-Elected to Maharashtra Legislative Council (3rd term)
 2015: Special Rights Committee (विशेष हक्क समिती) Pramukh Maharashtra Vidhan Mandal.
 2019: Elected as Deputy Chairman of Maharashtra Legislative Council
 2020: Re-Elected to Maharashtra Legislative Council (4th term)
 2020: Re-Elected as Deputy Chairman of Maharashtra Legislative Council
 2022 Acting chairman of Maharashtra Legislative Council on 07 July 2022

Awards 
 Neelam Gorhe received Newsmakers Achievers Awards in 2021.

See also
 List of members of the Maharashtra Legislative Council

References

External links
 official website
 Shivsena official website
 streeaadharkendra.org

Shiv Sena politicians
Members of the Maharashtra Legislative Council
Living people
Marathi politicians
1954 births
Chairs of the Maharashtra Legislative Council